The Golding Baronetcy, of Colston Bassett in the County of Nottingham, was a title in the Baronetage of England.  It was created on 27 September 1642 for Edward Golding.  The title became extinct on the death of the third Baronet in 1715.

Golding baronets, of Colston Bassett (1642)
Sir Edward Golding, 1st Baronet (died )
Sir Charles Golding, 2nd Baronet (c. 1624 – 1661)
Sir Edward Golding, 3rd Baronet (died 1715)

References

Extinct baronetcies in the Baronetage of England